Saied Reza Ameli (In Persian سعیدرضا عاملی, born 1961 in Karaj, Iran) is a (full) professor of Communication at the University of Tehran. He is currently a member of Department of Communications and the director of the UNESCO Chair on Cyberspace and Culture, and Cyberspace Policy Research Center, Faculty of World Studies at the University of Tehran.
Over the past decade, Ameli has been working on issues of Muslim minority identity in the West, and Muslim minority rights in UK, France and the U.S. He also serves as the editor-in-chief of Journal of Cyberspace Studies. He was also Secretary of Supreme Council of the Cultural Revolution. He is the member of Supreme Council of Cyberspace and Supreme Council of the Cultural Revolution.

Education
1977: Graduate from John F. Kennedy High School – Sacramento, United States
1977-78: BA in mechanical engineering at the University of Sacramento (uncompleted)
1980-92: Seminary study in Islamic studies including, Arabic literature, theology, logic, philosophy, jurisprudence and principal of jurisprudence
1988-92: BA in social sciences at the University of Tehran
1994-95: MA in sociology of communications in University College of Dublin, dissertation topic was: The Relationship between TV programs and Religious Practices and Values
1996-01: PhD in sociology of communications, at the Royal Holloway University of London, his research topic was: The Impact of Globalization on British Muslim Identity

References

External links
Faculty of World Studies

Academic staff of the University of Tehran
1961 births
Living people
Alumni of Royal Holloway, University of London
Academic staff of the Faculty of World Studies
Iranian expatriates in the United Kingdom